Bisericani may refer to:

Places in Romania
 Bisericani, a village in Bucium, Alba County
 Bisericani, a village in Lupeni, Harghita County
 Bisericani, a village in Alexandru cel Bun, Neamț County

Places in Moldova
 Bisericani, a village in Cuhneşti Commune, Glodeni district